Chemical warfare is the use of chemical substances in warfare.

Chemical Warfare may also refer to:
 "Chemical Warfare", a song by Dead Kennedys from the 1980 album Fresh Fruit for Rotting Vegetables
 Chemical Warfare (The Alchemist album), 2009
 Chemical Warfare (Escape the Fate album), 2021
 "Chemical Warfare", a song by Slayer from the 1984 EP Haunting the Chapel